The Pathans of Madhya Pradesh are an Urdu-speaking Pashtun community settled in the present-day Indian state of Madhya Pradesh as well as a small minority of internal migrants and their descendants in neighbouring Chhattisgarh state, which was partitioned in 2000.

History and origin
The early Pathan settlers in what became the princely state of Bhopal were known as Barru-kat, because they initially used reeds for roofing their houses, in which it became an aspect of their local architecture.

Bhopal became a hub for Pathan settlement, with others arriving to be soldiers in the Begum's army. Immigration continued until the creation of Pakistan in 1947.

The state of Jaora was settled by Indian Rohillas from neighbouring Uttar Pradesh as well as other Indian Muslims freebooters of Uttar Pradesh such as the Indian Sayyids.

See also
 Pathans of Gujarat
 Pathans of Rajasthan
 Pathans of Uttar Pradesh

References

Muslim communities of Madhya Pradesh
Madhya Pradesh
Social groups of Madhya Pradesh